is a city located in Shiga Prefecture, Japan. , the city had an estimated population of 50,695 in 20695 households and a population density of 630 persons per km2.

Geography
Yasu is located in south-central Shiga Prefecture, on the eastern shore of Lake Biwa. The city skyline is dominated by Mount Mikami, also known as "Ōmi Fuji" from its resemblance to Mount Fuji. Parts of the city are within the borders of the Mikami-Tanakami-Shigaraki Prefectural Natural Park.

Neighboring municipalities
Shiga Prefecture
Ōmihachiman
Moriyama
Rittō
Konan
Ryūō

Climate
Yasu has a Humid subtropical climate (Köppen Cfa) characterized by warm summers and cool winters with light to no snowfall.  The average annual temperature in Yasu is 14.5 °C. The average annual rainfall is 1430 mm with September as the wettest month. The temperatures are highest on average in August, at around 25.3 °C, and lowest in January, at around 3.1 °C.

Demographics
Per Japanese census data, the population of Yasu doubled from 1960 to 2000 and has plateaued since then.

History 
Yasu is part of ancient  Ōmi Province and the route of the Tōsandō (later the Nakasendō) highway connecting Heian-kyō with the eastern provinces passed through the area; however, there were no shukuba within the city limits. Most of the area was tenryō territory under direct control of the Tokugawa shogunate in the Edo period. The minor feudal domain of Mikami Domain controlled by a cadet branch of the Endo clan had its jin'ya in Yasu, but its estates were widely scattered in other locations, mostly in Izumi province.  The town of Yasu was established with the creation of the modern municipalities system on April 1, 1889. Yasu annexed the village of Mikami in 1942, and the villages of Shinohara and Gio in 1955, On October 1, 2004, Yasu absorbed the neighboring town of Chūzu (also from Yasu District) and was elevated to city status. Yasu District was dissolved as a result of this merger.

Government
Yasu has a mayor-council form of government with a directly elected mayor and a unicameral city council of 18 members. Yasu contributes two members to the Shiga Prefectural Assembly. In terms of national politics, the city is part of Shiga 3rd district of the lower house of the Diet of Japan.

Economy
The economy of Yasu is centered on agriculture and light manufacturing. There are several industrial parks in the city.

Education
Yasu has six public elementary schools and three public middle schools operated by the city government. There is one public high school operated by the Shiga Prefectural Department of Education. The prefecture also operates one special education school for the handicapped.

Transportation

Railway
 JR West – Biwako Line

Highway

Sister city relations 
  Clinton Township, Michigan, USA (1993)

Local attractions 
Mikami Shrine, with National Treasure honden
Ōsasahara Shrine, with National Treasure honden
Ōiwayama Kofun Cluster, a National Historic Site

Notable people
Saihei Hirose, industrialist, director of Sumitomo zaibatsu
Kurama Tatsuya, former sumo wrestler and television personality
Takanori Nishikawa, musician
Kurumi Mamiya, voice actress

References

External links 

  
 Yasu International Association

Cities in Shiga Prefecture
Yasu, Shiga